Evka 3 is the eastern terminus of the F. Altay—Evka 3 Line of the İzmir Metro. The station opened on 30 March 2012, along with Ege Üniversitesi station, as part of a  eastward expansion. The line is expected to be extended further, this time back west, from Evka 3 to central Bornova. Evka 3 consists of two side platforms serving two tracks.

Station Layout

References

İzmir Metro
Railway stations opened in 2012
2012 establishments in Turkey
Railway stations in İzmir Province